Črete (sometimes cited as Čretež pri Ledini,  or Tschrete) is a former settlement in the Municipality of Sevnica in central Slovenia. It is now part of the village of Ledina. The area is part of the traditional region of Styria. The municipality is now included in the Lower Sava Statistical Region.

Geography

Name
Like the related names Čreta and Čret, the name Črete is derived from the common noun čreta or čret 'marshland, morass', referring to the local geography.

History
Črete was deemed annexed by Ledina in 1955, ending any existence it had as an independent settlement.

References

External links
Črete on Geopedia

Populated places in the Municipality of Sevnica
Former settlements in Slovenia